During the 1982–83 English football season, Watford F.C. competed in the Football League First Division, after being promoted from the Second Division the previous season. Under Graham Taylor's management, Watford finished second in the First Division – their highest ever league finish. As a result, Watford qualified for European competition for the first time. Luther Blissett finished the season as the division's top scorer, with 27 league goals.

League table

Squad
Squad at end of season

References

Further reading

Watford F.C. seasons
Watford